The 1893 Vanderbilt Commodores football team represented Vanderbilt University during the 1893 college football season. The team's head coach and team captain was W. J. Keller, who only coached one season in that capacity at Vanderbilt. The season started 2–1 and finished with a four-game winning streak.

Schedule

References

Vanderbilt
Vanderbilt Commodores football seasons
Vanderbilt Commodores football